Herina paludum is a species of picture-winged fly in the genus Herina of the family Ulidiidae.

Distribution
This species is present in most of Europe (England, France, Germany, Italy, Latvia, Sweden, Egypt, Austria, Hungary, Romania, Poland, Switzerland, Czech Republic, Slovakia, Germany, Greece and Slovenia) and in North Africa.

Description
In these picture-winged flies mesonotum and abdominal tergites are shining black. Scutellum is brownish-black. The central area of the head between the eyes (frontal stripe) is velvet-black. Face is conspicuously produced anteriorly, lower face is shining black. Eyes are reddish brown. The third segment of the antennae is long and strap-like. Wings are hyaline, with few brown patches, mainly a partly brown costal cell and a rounded or band-like apical spot. Femora and tibiae are  partly dark brown.

References

External links
DEpository

Ulidiidae
Insects described in 1820
Diptera of Europe
Diptera of Africa